Chirine is a given name and a surname.

Notable people with the given name include:
Chirine Knaidil (born 1994), Moroccan footballer
Chirine Lamti (born 1994), Tunisian footballer
Chirine Njeim (born 1984), Lebanese alpine skier and long-distance runner

Notable people with the surname include:
Fawzia Fuad Chirine (1921–2013), Egyptian princess 
Ismail Chirine (1919–1994), Egyptian diplomat